Kiara Barnes is an American actor, singer and model known for The Bold and the Beautiful and Fantasy Island.

Career

Modeling 
Kiara Barnes began her career as a model.

Acting 
From 2018 to 2022, she played Zoe Buckingham in the soap opera The Bold and the Beautiful. In 2020 she held the role of Octavia in the series Stuck with You. In the same year she held the role of Clarissa in the television film The Wrong Wedding Planner directed by David DeCoteau. The following year, 2021, she played the role of Ruby Akuda in the series Fantasy Island.

Music 
In 2018 she released an EP, titled Sirens to the Moon.

Filmography

TV series

Discography

Singles

References

External links 
 
 

Living people
Actors from Salt Lake City
21st-century American actresses
21st-century American women singers
American female models
Musicians from Salt Lake City
Year of birth missing (living people)